Marin Joy Mazzie (October 9, 1960 – September 13, 2018) was an American actress and singer known for her work in musical theatre.

Mazzie was a three-time Tony Award nominee, for her performances as Clara in Passion (1994), Mother in Ragtime (1998), and Lilli Vanessi/Katherine in Kiss Me, Kate (1999). For her work in Kiss Me, Kate, Mazzie was also nominated for a Drama Desk Award and Olivier Award, and she won an Outer Critics Circle Award.

In addition to appearing in many musical stage productions, Mazzie also performed in concert with her husband, Jason Danieley.

Early life
Mazzie was born in Rockford, Illinois, and graduated from Western Michigan University, where she received degrees in theater and music. With an early interest in the theatre, Mazzie began to perform and sing in church choir at the age of 8 and to study voice at the age of 12. She continued to act in school and at college and in summer stock, where she was an apprentice at the Barn Theatre in Augusta, Michigan. While performing at the Barn, Mazzie befriended composer Jonathan Larson, who would go on to write Rent.

Career
After graduating from college in 1982, Mazzie moved to New York City and made her New York stage debut in a 1983 Equity Library Theatre revival of the 1948 musical Where's Charley? as Kitty Verdun. She appeared in the 1991 off-Broadway Kander and Ebb revue And the World Goes 'Round and the subsequent 10-month national tour the following year. She went on to play starring roles in over a half dozen Broadway shows and also developed a cabaret act and made appearances in television.

In 1994 Mazzie created the role of Clara in the Stephen Sondheim musical Passion. This production was notable for its opening scene in which she was nude in bed with co-star Jere Shea. In 1998 Mazzie originated the role of Mother in the original production of Lynn Ahrens and Stephen Flaherty's musical Ragtime. She played the dual roles of Lilli Vanessi/Katharine in the 1999 revival of Kiss Me, Kate on Broadway and then transferred to the West End production in 2001. All three roles earned her Tony Award nominations.

About the 2006 Encores! presentation of Kismet at New York City Center, the Variety reviewer wrote: "Mazzie steals the comic thunder with a delicious turn as the glamorous Slut of the Casbah (Lalume), lewdly checking out the tasty man-slaves and happily playing along with Hajj's trickery, simply because he's hot. Looking dynamite in a flashy gold Donatella-goes-Mesopotamian number and a soufflé of blond curls, Mazzie's campy delivery of 'Not Since Nineveh' and the beyond-jaded 'Bored' succeeds in briefly raising the temperature of the otherwise tepid brew."

In May 2008 she appeared as Guenevere opposite Gabriel Byrne as King Arthur and Nathan Gunn as Lancelot in the New York Philharmonic staged concert presentation of Lerner and Loewe's Camelot, directed by Lonny Price. The May 8, 2008 performance of this production was broadcast nationally on Live from Lincoln Center on PBS.

Mazzie appeared in the drama ENRON, opening on Broadway in April 2010, as corporate vice president Claudia Roe. She replaced Alice Ripley as Diana in Next to Normal on July 19, 2010, opposite her real-life husband, Jason Danieley, as Dan. They stayed with the show until the Broadway production closed on January 16, 2011.

On November 20, 2009, Mazzie performed in a reading of a re-worked version of the 1988 Broadway flop Carrie as Margaret White. She stayed with the production which opened Off-Broadway on March 1, 2012, at the Lucille Lortel Theatre.

Mazzie appeared as Helen Sinclair in the Woody Allen/Susan Stroman musical Bullets Over Broadway: The Musical, which ran on Broadway from April to August 2014. She assumed the lead role of Anna Leonowens from Kelli O'Hara in the Lincoln Center revival of The King and I. Mazzie began performances on May 3, 2016, and stayed with the show until it closed on June 26, 2016.

Honors
Mazzie was inducted into the American Theater Hall of Fame for 2017, in a ceremony at the Gershwin Theatre held in November 2017. In April 2019, it was announced that Mazzie would be the recipient of a posthumous Special Tony Award for her legacy as an advocate for women's health.

Concerts, TV, and recordings
Mazzie also appeared on television. In the sitcom Still Standing, Mazzie and Kevin Nealon played an antagonistic neighbor couple in recurring roles.

She regularly performed in cabarets and concerts. She appeared in a Gala charity concert at Carnegie Hall in 1998, "My Favorite Broadway: The Leading Ladies", hosted by Julie Andrews. She and her husband, Jason Danieley, along with Faith Prince, performed a concert as a tribute to Jerry Herman in October–November 2003 in Utah with the Utah Symphony. This was similar to the Herman tribute Mazzie performed with the Boston Pops in May 2003.

Mazzie and her husband performed at the Bay Area Cabaret (San Francisco) season on October 23, 2005, performing their "Opposite You" program. In November 2005 they released an album, Opposite You (PS Classics label), consisting of songs sung in their cabaret program.

Personal life
Mazzie was married to fellow Broadway actor Jason Danieley, whom she met in 1996 in a play they performed together, Trojan Women: A Love Story.

Death

Mazzie died on the morning of September 13, 2018, following a three-year battle with ovarian cancer. She was survived by her husband, her mother, and her brother. In honor of Mazzie's work, the lights of every single Broadway theatre dimmed for one minute at 6:45 p.m. on September 19, 2018.

Stage appearances (selected)
Note: Broadway unless noted
 Big River (1985): Mary Jane Wilkes (replacement)
 Into the Woods (1987): Rapunzel, (u/s Witch, Cinderella, Florinda, Lucinda) (replacement) 
 Passion (1994): Clara (original)
 Out of This World (Encores! staged concert) (1995): Helen
 Ragtime (1998): Mother (original)
 Kiss Me, Kate (revival) (1999): Lilli Vanessi/Katharine
 Man of La Mancha (revival) (2002): Aldonza (Dulcinea) (replacement)
 110 in the Shade (revival, Los Angeles) (2004): Lizzie Curry
 Brigadoon (revival, Los Angeles) (2004): Fiona MacLaren
 Spamalot (2006–2008): The Lady of the Lake (replacement)
 Camelot (New York Philharmonic staged concert) (2008): Guenevere
 ENRON (2010): Claudia Roe (original)
 Next to Normal (2010): Diana Goodman (replacement)
 Carrie (revival, off-Broadway) (2012): Margaret White
 Bullets Over Broadway (original) (2014): Helen Sinclair
 The King and I (revival) (2016): Anna Leonowens (replacement)
 Fire and Air (original, off-Broadway) (2018): Misia Sert

Awards and nominations

References

External links

 

1960 births
2018 deaths
Actresses from Illinois
American musical theatre actresses
American television actresses
Actors from Rockford, Illinois
Musicians from Rockford, Illinois
Western Michigan University alumni
Deaths from ovarian cancer
Deaths from cancer in New York (state)
Special Tony Award recipients
21st-century American women